was an aristocrat-bureaucrat of the Ryukyu Kingdom. He was also a famous musician credited with the creation of Tansui-ryū, an important music genre of Ryukyu culture.

"Tansui Ueekata" is actually a nickname. "Tansui" was his pseudonym, "Ueekata" was his rank.

Tansui Ueekata was a cousin of Shō Shōken. He was good at sanshin and ryūka. He was dispatched to Satsuma for four times. There he studied the theatre of Japan. Later, he incorporated Japanese elements into Ryukyuan music.

Shō Shōken totally denied the traditional culture of the Ryukyuan people, and was strongly opposed by Tansui Ueekata. It made Shō Shōken very angry. Tansui was removed from his position and forced to retire.

References

1623 births
1683 deaths
People of the Ryukyu Kingdom
17th-century Ryukyuan people
Ryukyuan culture
17th-century musicians